Clothier Harbour is the 1.5 km wide bay indenting for 1 km the north coast of Robert Island in the South Shetland Islands, Antarctica between Hammer Point on the northeast and Onogur Islands on the southwest.  The harbour was used as a safe base by American sealing ships in 1820–21.

The bay was discovered, charted and named by American sealers after the vessel Clothier under Captain Clark, which sank there in December 1820.

Location

See also
 Robert Island
 South Shetland Islands

Map
 L.L. Ivanov. Antarctica: Livingston Island and Greenwich, Robert, Snow and Smith Islands. Scale 1:120000 topographic map. Troyan: Manfred Wörner Foundation, 2010.  (First edition 2009. )

References
 SCAR Composite Antarctic Gazetteer.

Landforms of Robert Island
Bays of the South Shetland Islands